Be Still is an album by Dave Douglas' Quintet with guest vocalist and guitarist Aoife O'Donovan which was released in September 2012 on the Greenleaf Music label. The album was released in response to the loss of his mother.

Reception

Thom Jurek for Allmusic states, "Be Still is brimming with poetic elegance; but it is also adventurous in its graceful articulation of folk forms (jazz is one of them, after all), and possesses a creativity and musical sophistication that is above all, revelatory". Writing for All About Jazz, Glenn Astarita said "Be Still is a significant entry into Douglas's hefty and multifarious discography. It's a beautiful production, brimming with memorable pieces that sustain recurring listens. Figuratively speaking, the program may be analogous to an elegantly wrapped gift waiting to be opened".  PopMatters' Will Layman stated "With Be Still, Dave Douglas seems to be standing both smack in the middle of American art—jazz, sure, but so much else as well—and slightly apart from it. He’s seeing connections and beauty where others might not. He’s making something that is mysterious but also ought to touch any listener who dares beyond the Top 40. It’s a great, great record".

Track listing
 "Be Still My Soul" (Katharina Von Schlegel, Jean Sibelius) - 5:01    
 "High On a Mountain" (Ola Belle Reed) - 2:37    
 "God Be with You" (Jeremiah Rankin, William G. Tomer) - 5:00    
 "Barbara Allen" (Traditional) - 4:22    
 "This Is My Father's World" (Maltbie Davenport Babcock) - 3:43    
 "Going Somewhere with You" (Dave Douglas) - 5:23
 "Middle March" (Douglas) - 5:46
 "Living Streams" (Traditional) - 5:02
 "Whither Must I Wander?" (Ralph Vaughan Williams) - 5:59

Personnel
Dave Douglas - trumpet
Aoife O'Donovan – guitar, vocals 
Jon Irabagon - tenor saxophone
Matt Mitchell - piano
Linda Oh - bass
Rudy Royston - drums

References

2012 albums
Dave Douglas (trumpeter) albums
Greenleaf Music albums